Run for Your Life, published in 2009, is the second novel in the Michael Bennett series by the American authors James Patterson and Michael Ledwidge. The novel debuted on the New York Times Best-Seller list at number 2 on February 20, 2009.

Critical reception
James Mitchell of Tonight said that, while he liked the novel, it was "somewhat predictable towards the end".

References

2009 American novels
Novels by James Patterson
American thriller novels
Little, Brown and Company books
Collaborative novels